Cruciform blocks are blocks commonly found in public housing estates and HOS courts. They are cross-shaped and may have 8 to 10 units per floor. The height can change or vary by location. Heights can range from 20 to 40 stories. They are built between 1980 and 2005. Two designs exist, which are Old and New Cruciform.

Old Cruciform 
Old Cruciform blocks predate New Cruciform. It is the first design to be a part of the HOS cruciform category developed by the HA, developed in 1976. The first blocks are located in Yue Shing Court, completed in 1980. The last blocks are located in Siu Shan Court, completed in 1984.

Old Cruciform usually has 8 units per floor. The height is usually 20 stories or less. Most are conjoined with others. This has three variants, with an area of only 492–563 ft².

Before, most were located in public housing estates. In 1979, the authority converted the units into HOS housing. The only block to be located in an estate is located at Sun Tin Wai Estate, which is currently public rental housing.

New Cruciform 
New Cruciform blocks is an improved design from Old Cruciform. The design in common in public housing estates and HOS courts.

Overview 
The new design appeared since 1983. The first blocks are located at Ching Wah Court, Tuen Mun, Tsing Yi, Kwai Tsing, Kam On Court, Ma On Shan, Sha Tin, which were all completed in 1987. Another batch is located at Tung Tao Court, Shau Kei Wan, Eastern Dist., HK.

Design 
New Cruciform blocks are designed exclusively for HOS courts. Therefore, it has only 10 units per story. There are two bedrooms for each unit. Three bedroom units are rare, and look like private housing. There are four wings, two having 3, while the rest have 2.

The block at Wo Che Estate was originally to have a cross-shaped design, but because of terrain and noise restrictions, it was changed into a T-shaped, only having 6 units per floor. 4 of the units have two-bedroom designs while 2 of the units have three-bedroom designs.

Improvements in design 
By the end of 1998, property prices dropped because of a housing policy. The authority had to reduce HOS units. In 2002, the government suspended the construction of HOS courts. HOS blocks are converted into public rental housing. It faced problems, like, aging population and falling birth rates.

Layouts had not changed that much since introduction. The elevators changed into "high-to-low" and "single-double" design. It produced problems, like not stopping on the same floor. Windows at elevator lobbies were changed. Original partitions are used to give bathrooms and windows more space. Therefore, it became the "new version of the New Cruciform".

Windows of stairs were very small at the time. The new design adopted an improved design that became similar to Concord blocks.

From 1987 to 2005, there are 59 blocks in HOS courts in Hong Kong and Kowloon, 97 in New Territories, 63 in public housing estates, and 4 in government quarters. Therefore, there are 223 blocks total.

Gallery

See also 
Harmony Block
Types of public housing estate blocks in Hong Kong
Concord Block

References 

Public housing in Hong Kong